College Humor may refer to:
College Humor (magazine), a U.S. humor magazine of the early 20th century
College Humor (film), a 1933 musical film starring Bing Crosby
CollegeHumor, a 21st-century U.S. humor website
The CollegeHumor Show, a television show on MTV based on the website